Valentina Batres Guadarrama (born 26 May 1971) is a Mexican politician affiliated with the National Regeneration Movement (formerly to the Party of the Democratic Revolution). As of 2014 he served as Deputy of the LX Legislature of the Mexican Congress representing Federal District.

References

1971 births
Living people
Politicians from Mexico City
Women members of the Chamber of Deputies (Mexico)
Members of the Chamber of Deputies (Mexico)
Institutional Revolutionary Party politicians
Morena (political party) politicians
21st-century Mexican politicians
21st-century Mexican women politicians
Deputies of the LX Legislature of Mexico